The Steve Howe Album is Yes guitarist Steve Howe's second solo album. It was released in 1979. The album features Yes band members Alan White, Bill Bruford and Patrick Moraz. Also featured is Jethro Tull's former drummer Clive Bunker on percussion on Cactus Boogie. Ronnie Leahy is also featured on keyboards for two songs; he would later play with Jon Anderson on his second solo album, Song of Seven in 1980.

Track listing
All songs written by Steve Howe except where noted.

Side one
 "Pennants" – 4:35
 "Cactus Boogie" – 2:00
 "All's a Chord" – 4:55
 "Diary of a Man Who Vanished"  – 2:35
 "Look Over Your Shoulder" – 5:00

Side two

Personnel
Steve Howe – guitars (acoustic, electric, bass, Spanish, Danelectro electric sitar, pedal steel), mandolin, six-string banjo, Moog synthesizer, vocals (3)
Claire Hamill – vocals (5)
Ronnie Leahy – Korg & ARP synthesizers, Hammond organ (1, 5)
Patrick Moraz – piano (3)
Alan White – drums (1, 5)
Bill Bruford – drums (3)
Clive Bunker – percussion (2)
 – violin (7)
59 piece classical orchestra arranged and conducted by Andrew Jackman (9)
String ensemble (10)

Guitars used on the recording
The inner part of the gatefold album artwork features pictures of the guitars that were used during the recording and a legend to indicate the tracks on which they were played. The photographs of the guitars are credited to Miki Slingsby.

Chart performance

References

External links
Complete album artwork
Yescography entry
Steve Howe's Martin 0018
EB-6 Catalogue Page
Les Paul Recording Guitar
Steve Howe Discography

Steve Howe (musician) albums
1979 albums
Albums with cover art by Roger Dean (artist)
Atlantic Records albums